Georgi Valeryevich Natabashvili (born 21 February 2000) is a Russian football player of Georgian descent. He plays for FC Alania Vladikavkaz and FC Alania-2 Vladikavkaz.

Club career
He made his debut in the Russian Football National League for FC Alania Vladikavkaz on 1 August 2020 in a game against FC SKA-Khabarovsk, as a starter.

References

External links
 
 Profile by Russian Football National League
 

2000 births
Footballers from Moscow
Russian people of Georgian descent
Living people
Russian footballers
Association football goalkeepers
FC Spartak Vladikavkaz players
FC Olimp-Dolgoprudny players
Russian First League players
Russian Second League players